Lorena Rojas (born Seydi Lorena Rojas Gonzalez; 10 February 1971 – 16 February 2015) was a Mexican actress and singer, best known for her leading roles in popular telenovelas.

Biography
Seydi Lorena Rojas Gonzalez was born in Mexico City, Mexico and began her artistic career in 1990 when she participated in the telenovela Alcanzar Una Estrella produced by Televisa. This telenovela was so successful that she went on to record a sequel Alcanzar Una Estrella II the following year. Between 1992 and 1997 she starred in several Televisa productions including Buscando El Paraiso, Bajo Un Mismo Rostro and El Alma No Tiene Color until she signed to TV Azteca in 1998. 

This same year, she starred in the period drama Azul Tequila, sharing credits with Mauricio Ochmann, with whom she would later star in 2001's Como En El Cine. 2001 also saw the release of Rojas's debut album as a singer Como Yo No Hay Ninguna, recording songs by legendary songwriter/producer Richard Daniel Roman. In 2003, Rojas signed to Telemundo, later taping in that same year the telenovela Ladrón De Corazones besides Manolo Cardona. In 2005, she starred in her most acclaimed telenovela El cuerpo del deseo, beside Andrés García, Mario Cimarro, Erick Elías, and Sonia Noemí, among others, which proved to be an international success, broadcast by Telemundo. In 2006 she released her second album, Deseo.

Death
On 16 February 2015, Rojas died of breast cancer, six days after her 44th birthday, in Miami, Florida. She had been battling the disease since 2008, and it had spread to other organs, including her liver.

Filmography

Discography
 Como Yo No Hay Ninguna (Azteca Music) (2001)
 Deseo (Big Moon Records) (2006)

References

External links
Obituary, latintimes.com; accessed 17 February 2015.
Lorena Rojas Official Twitter page; accessed 17 February 2015.

1971 births
2015 deaths
Mexican expatriates in the United States
Mexican women singers
Mexican telenovela actresses
Mexican television presenters
Deaths from breast cancer
Deaths from cancer in Florida
Mexican women television presenters